Associazione Calcio Milan began the 2004–05 season auspiciously by winning the 2004 Supercoppa Italiana, with a comfortable 3–0 victory over Lazio (the winners of the previous season's Coppa Italia), thanks to a hat-trick by Andriy Shevchenko. 

The Serie A began with a 2–2 draw against Livorno. For most of the season, Milan were second to Juventus, in a close points race. However, after matchweeks 25 through 30, and again matchweeks 33 through 34, Milan were in first place. On 8 May 2005, Milan faced Juventus at home; by matchweek 35, the two had almost identical statistics of 76 points, 23 wins, 7 draws, and 4 defeats, with Milan's marginally superior goal difference of +36 against Juventus' +35 keeping them on top. Having lost the potential title deciding game 1–0 to a goal by David Trezeguet, Milan drew three more times afterwards and finished in the second place.

In the Champions League, Milan were successful and sure-footed, comfortably topping their group (which included Barcelona, Celtic and Shakhtar Donetsk)  and then knocking out Manchester United, cross-city rivals Inter and PSV Eindhoven, thus reaching their second Champions League final in three years. The final was against Liverpool. In the first half Ancelotti's men scored three goals, one from Paolo Maldini, the club captain, and two from Hernán Crespo. However, in the second half, the English opponents managed to do the same in just 6 minutes, meaning the match went to extra time. Milan were not able to find a fourth goal and had to face a penalty shoot-out. Unlike in 2003, Milan players went first and missed the first and second penalty kicks (taken by Serginho and Pirlo). Shevchenko, who scored the deciding penalty two years earlier, had to score from the fifth penalty to keep Milan in the game, but failed to beat Dudek, and Liverpool won the Champions League, in one of the most famous come-backs in European football history.

Throughout the season, Ancelotti mostly used the 4–4–2 diamond (or 4–1–2–1–2) formation, which he had previously employed with much success, especially in 2002–03; the fact that four top-quality strikers were available (Shevchenko, Crespo, Inzaghi and Tomasson) made it almost imperative that two of them would have to be used as regular starters. On rare occasions, however, formations with three centrebacks and two wingbacks (usually Cafu and Serginho), such as 3–5–2 or 3–4–1–2, were used.

Players

Squad information
Squad at end of season

Left club during season

Reserve squad

Transfers

In

First-team

Total spending:  €

Out

First-team

Reserves

Competitions

Supercoppa

Serie A

League table

Results by round

Matches

Coppa Italia

Round of 16

Quarter-finals

UEFA Champions League

Group stage

Knockout phase

Round of 16

Quarter-finals

Semi-finals

Final

Statistics

Appearances and goals
As of 31 June 2005

References

A.C. Milan seasons
Milan